The 1999–2000 Gamma Ethniki was the 17th season since the official establishment of the third tier of Greek football in 1983. Akratitos was crowned champion, thus winning promotion to Beta Ethniki. Nafpaktiakos Asteras also won promotion as a runner-up of the league.

Thesprotos, Agersani Naxos, Niki Volos, Neapolis Thessaloniki, Poseidon Michaniona, Ethnikos Katerini, Keratsini, Karditsa, Edessaikos and Doxa Vyronas were relegated to Delta Ethniki.

League table

Relegation play-offs

|}

Top scorers

References

Third level Greek football league seasons
3
Greece